Branquignol is a 1949 French comedy film directed by Robert Dhéry and starring Colette Brosset, Julien Carette and Annette Poivre. It takes its name from a comedy troupe of the same name. It was shot at the Epinay Studios in Paris. The film's sets were designed by the art director Roger Briaucourt.

Synospsi
The Marquis de Pressaille plans to announce his engagement during a gala show. However in support of one of their friends who is in love with his intended bride, the Branquignol sets out to sabotage the announcement.

Cast
 Colette Brosset as Caroline
 Julien Carette as Lui-même en majordome - puis en machiniste de théâtre minable
 Annette Poivre as La spectatrice aux pommes de terre
 Raymond Bussières as Le plombier
 Marcel Vallée as Le préfet
 Madeleine Lambert as La marquise de Pressailles
 Raymond Souplex as Le convive de sang-froid
 Mathilde Casadesus as Suzanne
 Pierre Destailles as Pierrot
 Michèle Lahaye as La colonelle
 Albert Duvaleix as Le scrogneugneu
 Pierrette Rossi as Pierrette
 Robert Rocca as Le protestataire
 Rose Mania as La femme jalouse
 Henri Leca as Le mari de la femme jalouse
 Jean Carmet as Bidel - un fantaisiste raté
 Jacques Emmanuel as Le marquis Hercule de Pressailles
 Micheline Dax as Aurélie de la Molette
 Roger Saget as Le majordome
 Paulette Arnoux as La femme du spectateur sourd
 Jacques Legras as Le domestique qui crie trop fort
 René Dupuy as Gabriel
 Jean Pignol as Un cow-boy
 Johnny Sabrou as Le guitariste de l'orchestre
 Titys as Le spectateur sourd
 Denise Provence as Une danseuse
 Al Cabrol as Un cow-boy
 Loulou Ferrari as La partenaire de l'Hercule
 Charles Montel as Un vieil homme
 Pauline Carton as L'astiqueuse de cloches
 André Gabriello as Le spectateur qui a trop chaud
 Robert Dhéry as Bill Rockett - un cow-boy d'opérette
 Christian Duvaleix as Un branquignol
 Rosine Luguet as Elle-même en funambule
 Robert Destain as Le chanteur
 Henri Ferrari as Lui-même en Hercule de foire
 Gérard Calvi as Le chef d'orchestre
 Capucine as Une cow-girl
 Christiane Minazzoli as La danseuse au ballon

References

Bibliography 
 Oscherwitz, Dayna & Higgins, MaryEllen. The A to Z of French Cinema. Scarecrow Press, 2009.

External links 
 

1949 films
1949 comedy films
French comedy films
1940s French-language films
Films directed by Robert Dhéry
Films shot at Epinay Studios
1940s French films